Salvia thermarum (Goudini sage) is a perennial native to South Africa, discovered in 1998 by Ernst van Jaarsveld of Cape Town's Kirstenbosch National Botanical Garden. The common name is based on the location of the plant's discovery, near Goudini Spa, approximately 120 km from Cape Town—the specific epithet, thermarum, refers to the thermal baths where it was found. It is only found native in the Cape Provinces.

The dark green stems have glandular hairs when young, getting smooth with age. The plant is easily confused with the closely related Salvia granitica.

Notes

Plants described in 1999
thermarum
Flora of the Cape Provinces